The Couples for Christ (CFC) is an international Catholic lay ecclesial movement whose goal is to renew and strengthen Christian values. It is one of 123 International Associations of the Faithful. 

The organization is linked to the Vatican through the Pontifical Council for the Laity, and is led by an International Council based in the Philippines under the Catholic Bishops' Conference of the Philippines. The community consists of family ministries, social arms, and anti-abortion ministries.

History

Couples for Christ (CFC) was established in 1981 by the charismatic community Ang Ligaya ng Panginoon (LNP; Filipino for "The Joy of the Lord") in Manila. Its target groups were primarily married couples, inviting prospective couples to a private home for a series of weekly gospel discussions.

Since 1993, CFC had also started other demographic-specific groups, including "Kids for Christ," "Youth for Christ," "Singles for Christ," "Handmaids of the Lord" and "Servants of the Lord."

In 1996, CFC was approved by the Catholic Bishops' Conference of the Philippines as a National Private Association of Lay Faithful and recognized in 2000 by the Holy See as a private international association of the lay faithful of Pontifical Right.

CFC is present in dioceses across all 81 Philippine provinces and 163 countries. It sent participants to the Extraordinary Synod on the Family organised by Pope Francis in 2014.

Membership and Community Life

Any validly married Catholic couple can become members of CFC. Although a Catholic movement/organization, CFC also accepts non-Catholic Christians.

Christian Life Program
People interested in joining CFC will go through the weekly seminar series “Christian Life Program” (CLP), which usually spans 13 weeks, equivalent to 13 sessions. The CLP serves as the primary approach for Evangelization, and is a core activity for CFC members.

At the end of the CLP, couples are invited to dedicate themselves to the Lord as CFC members, and commit themselves to active participation in community life and the Church through regular prayer meetings, attendance in community assemblies and teachings, and participation in parish life. CLP graduates are then grouped into cell groups called "households," consisting of 4 to 7 couples under the pastoral care of a family head.

The CLP is also the point of entry for those who wish to join CFC's Family Ministries:
 Singles for Christ, for single young professionals
 Handmaids of the Lord and Servants of the Lord, for widowed women and men, single parents, or those whose spouses choose not to join
 Youth for Christ (teenagers) and Kids for Christ (pre-teens), through attendance in a regular camp or similar activity.

The goals of the CLP are evangelization and renewal. Taking the basic message of Christianity and to proclaim it a new so that those who hear it can make a renewed commitment to the Lord. This is also to bring individuals to a stronger relationship with God, family and church.

The CLP proper is divided into three modules, composed of four sessions each:

Module One - The Basic Truths About Christianity 

Module Two - The Authentic Christian life 

Module Three - Living a Spirit-filled Christian Life

Household Groups
Household groups or simply 'households' meet once a week or bi-weekly. Each member of the household is encouraged to host meetings at their home, when not held in Church meeting spaces. A household group operates as a 'family of families'. Household meetings can be conducted as pastoral or fellowship.

Evangelization Approaches

Christian Life Program Revised
In 2014, an update of the Christian Life Program has been released to reflect that CFC is explicitly Catholic, truly global, and devotedly Marian.

ANCOP
ANCOP stands for Answering the Cry of the Poor. It is an umbrella program made for the purpose of consolidating CFC's efforts in 'Building the Church of the Poor,' essentially a social outreach undertaking. Shelter-building for the poor and child-education sponsorship are among its dominant sub-programs. Certain aspects affecting the society are also being addressed through the ANCOP program, such as health, education, livelihood and community development activities.

As a social outreach program, ANCOP also involves sectors such as migrants and their families, uniformed personnel, those in prison, and environment stakeholders. Through ANCOP, sub-organizations like cooperatives and mini-programs like The Cornerstone have materialized.

Cornerstone
This is a program of CFC and its Family ministries in the cooperation with Ateneo Center for Educational Development. The main objective of this program is to help grades 2 and 3 students in public schools on how to read and understand English. SFC members take the lead in teaching the students and providing them Values formation activities.

Ablaze Communications
ABLAZE Communications, or simply "ABLAZE" is registered as a subsidiary of Couples for Christ. It is involved in the production of audio-visual presentations and merchandizing of products.

Liveloud 
Liveloud is an annual praise and worship event first staged in 2009 featuring Catholic Christian Music.

References

External links

 

International associations of the faithful
Catholic Church in the Philippines
Christian organizations established in 1981
Catholic organizations established in the 20th century